Yousseph "Chico" Slimani (born 1971) is a British singer who rose to prominence in the United Kingdom after reaching the quarter-finals of the 2005 series of the talent show The X Factor. In 2006, he had a number one hit on the British charts entitled "It's Chico Time". In 2008, he appeared on the reality TV show CelebAir where he came third. In December 2019, he appeared at the 15th anniversary of Ely's Christmas light switch event.

Early life
Yousseph Slimani was born in Bridgend, Wales. He moved to live in Morocco from the age of two, when his father took him to live on the family farm. He returned to the United Kingdom with his father at the age of 14. After leaving school he trained on the Youth Training Scheme as an electrical engineer.

Aspiring to have a career in arts and entertainment, Slimani took part in an exotic dance troupe called "Extreme Force" and later became a singer/compere with Lapattack. He also worked as a stripper for a while. From a young age, he continued writing and recording songs. In 2004, Slimani worked as an actor and co-wrote, starred, produced and provided the soundtrack for the BAFTA nominated short film Winner Takes All alongside actor JC Mac.

Career

The X Factor and singing career
Judge Simon Cowell walked out of Slimani's initial X Factor audition after fellow judges Louis Walsh and Sharon Osbourne voted him through to the second round after he performed "If I Ever Fall in Love" (from Shai) / "Kiss" (from Prince and the Revolution).

His category ("Over 25s") was mentored by Osbourne, who put him through to the live television phase after a particularly memorable performance at the Osbournes' "home", in which he jumped into a shallow pool and danced in the water (still holding a live microphone).

Slimani was at first mocked in the press, but after changing the style of his performances, to become slightly more self-mocking, he began to win voters over. He also became the first contestant in a Simon Cowell show (Pop Idol, American Idol, The X Factor) to sing an original song (co-written with X Factor vocal coach Mark Hudson), the camp and iconic "It's Chico Time", named after his catchphrase (Chico: "What time is it?" Audience: "It's Chico Time!")

Cowell was converted during the series, commenting that Slimani was a 'born entertainer', even if he was not the recording artist the show was looking to discover. In the quarter-final, Slimani was voted out of the competition, which was won by Shayne Ward in December 2005.

The performances by Slimani during X Factor included:
Audition: "If I Ever Fall in Love" (from Shai) / "Kiss" (from Prince and the Revolution) (to Final 24)
Judges House: "Livin' la Vida Loca" (from Ricky Martin) (to Final 12)
Week 1: (15 October 2005): "Da Ya Think I'm Sexy" (from Rod Stewart) (Bottom 2, saved 2-1)
Week 2 (22 October 2005): "Play That Funky Music" (from Wild Cherry) (safe)
Week 3 (29 October 2005): "Livin' la Vida Loca" (from Ricky Martin) (Bottom 2, saved 2-1)
Week 4 (5 November 2005): "Kiss" (from Prince and the Revolution)
Week 5 (12 November 2005): "Hero" (from Enrique Iglesias)
Week 6 (19 November 2005): "It's Chico Time" by Chico Slimani (safe)
Week 7 (26 November 2005): "Billie Jean" by Michael Jackson (Bottom 2, saved 2-1) 
Quarter-Final (3 December 2005): "I Got You (I Feel Good)" (from James Brown) and "Time Warp" (from The Rocky Horror Picture Show) (Eliminated after receiving fewest public votes)

Slimani had originally planned to release "It's Chico Time" as a single before Christmas 2005, but for contractual reasons he had to wait. Slimani was stated as saying "I'm absolutely loving every minute of it, and looking forward to releasing the single at last". The single was eventually released in February 2006; it entered the UK Singles Chart at number one on 5 March 2006, toppling Madonna from the top spot. It remained at number one for two weeks. In early 2006, Slimani took part in the nationwide X Factor tour.

Slimani's follow-up single to No. 1 hit "It's Chico Time" was a cover of the song "D.I.S.C.O.", entered the chart at number 24 in August 2006 in the British Singles Chart. Slimani's single was an alternative version of the Ottawan hit with considerable changes in lyrics where Slimani sings: "C.H.I.C.O. on D.I.S.C.O.". He also amended the actual lyrics to "D dynamic // I incredible // S supersonic // C Chicolicious (alluding to his own name) // O oh, oh, oh".

His next single, "Curvy Cola Bottle Body", was released on 8 October 2007 and reached No. 45 in its first week in the chart. X Factor judge Sharon Osbourne and her husband Ozzy Osbourne appeared in the official video. Proceeds went to the British Eating Disorders Association.

Since his X factor appearance, Slimani has made many public appearances all over the UK. He toured at Butlins, performing full 45-minute sets along with a live band and dancers as part of The Chico Experience.

He also appeared in 2006 and on later occasions under his original name Yousseph Slimani in Muslim events singing Islamic songs including "Moulana", a song he composed, dedicated to Prophet Muhammad and the Awliya' (the Men of God).

The Slimani songs "I Wanna Dance With U" and "You Take My Breath Away" were written by Roachie and produced by Danny Kirsch. "Good Day" Another Roachie / Kirsch production was used as part of the 2007 Butlins TV adverts.

The video for Slimani's fourth single, "Are You in It For Love", was premiered on his official website. It is a cover of a Ricky Martin hit. His debut album titled Lights, Camera, Action was released beginning of 2009.

In 2010, Slimani recorded a single in support of the English Football Team to the 2010 FIFA World Cup in South Africa. Aptly entitled "It's England Time", a play on "It's Chico Time", it uses the same tune of his previous No. 1 hit with amended lyrics. The song was first played on The Chris Moyles Show. Slimani recorded the single after having a 'vision' that England won the 2010 World Cup and that in the celebrations, commentators made reference to his Chico Time song. The music video was shot in Pinewood Studios and the official release date of the single was 7 June 2010. Proceeds went to Rainbow Child Foundation to help underprivileged children in Africa.

Television and acting career
In May 2006, Slimani appeared on The Weakest Link. He was the second contestant voted off.
In December 2007, Slimani made an appearance on BBC Two's music panel comedy quiz show, Never Mind The Buzzcocks, as part of the "identity parade" feature. He was correctly identified by the panel.
Slimani made a guest appearance in the 2007 Christmas special of Ricky Gervais' TV series Extras, taking part in a mock-up of Celebrity Big Brother.
In the 2008 series of Ant and Dec's Saturday Night Takeaway, Slimani was a member of "Team Dec" in the feature "Ant vs. Dec: The Teams". Slimani also starred as the celebrity "hider" in an episode of the CBBC show Hider in the House.
Later in 2008, he featured as a celebrity in the reality television show CelebAir on ITV2. Slimani came third overall.
In November 2009, he returned to Never Mind The Buzzcocks as a joke upon guest panellist and investigative journalist Donal MacIntyre. Slimani was supposed to be part of a running scam on the show, feeding answers to the opposite team.
Slimani appeared at the Darlington Civic Theatre, starring as Aladdin in the 2009/10 pantomime. He also appeared as Aladdin in the 2010/2011 pantomime in Hull. In 2011/12, he appeared the title role of Jack and the Beanstalk at the Rotherham Civic Theatre, and in 2013/14 was in Aladdin at the Bradford Alhambra theatre.
He has his own TV show in pre-production. 26 episodes are planned overall of the children show. 
Slimani appeared in BBC One's 2011 series of Celebrity Total Wipeout. He won the"Dizzy Dummy" round and came second overall.
On 20 October 2011, Slimani appeared as a special guest on the ITV2 show Celebrity Juice.
He competed in ITV's 2012 series of Dancing On Ice, replacing Chesney Hawkes who had to withdraw due to an ankle injury, skating with Canadian bronze medallist Jodeyne Higgins. He competed in the finals coming 3rd.
He appeared on the BBC Two comedy series Room 101 in early 2012.
Slimani hosted via webcam an Online bingo session at Bingocams UK with the site giving 10% of the proceeds to his charity Rainbow Child Foundation
Slimani appeared on Pointless Celebrities on BBC One on 20 October 2012, where he was partnered with Sinitta. They made it through to the final round, with Slimani winning £500.
Slimani appeared on the Big Fat Anniversary Quiz in 2015, showing a pre-recorded question about the X Factor. Throughout the rest of the show panellist Jack Whitehall texted Slimani back and forth.

Film
Slimani is involved with a production company called Unity Films, and his daughter appeared in one of their short films, Left Holding Baby, for which Slimani composed the music. He also stars in the BAFTA-nominated 2004 short film Winner Takes All, along with his brother actor JC Mac . In 2005, he played a male stripper in Roberto Gomez Martin's Hell to Pay, a London underworld gangster film. In 2009, Slimani also appeared in 45, a psychological thrilling boxing movie also alongside JC Mac.

Personal life
Slimani is married to Daniyela Rakic-Slimani, sister of 2008 and 2009 Wimbledon Men's Doubles Champion Nenad Zimonjić. They have a daughter named Lalla-Khira, and a son Zacharia.

Anti Vaxx
Slimani has spoken at anti vaxx and anti lockdown protests with Piers Corbyn.

Stroke
It was confirmed that Slimani had suffered a stroke on 21 September 2018 aged 47.

Charity work
On 20 May 2006, Slimani appeared on ITV's coverage of The Prince's Trust 30th Birthday Concert. He took part in a Blind Date themed skit, being picked over Roger Moore and Richard E Grant by Dame Edna Everage.

Slimani founded the Rainbow Child Foundation with his wife Daniyela and JC Mac, and took part in a promotional video of the foundation to open an orphanage in Cambodia.

He took part in another Rainbow Child Foundation project in Malawi and South Africa with the charity One Water to see the work carried out installing Play Pumps. In 2011, Slimani visited Malawi and opened Play pumps there.

Chico's single "Curvy Cola Bottle Body" is a protest against the "size zero" phenomenon. As part of its promotion, Chico teamed up with the British Eating Disorders Association (BEAT) charity. Profits from the single were donated to the charity.

Proceeds from Slimani's 2010 single "It's England Time" went to the Rainbow Child Foundation to help underprivileged children in Africa.

On 7 February 2015, Slimani volunteered as one of the panel judges at the Dancing Strictly 2015 live charity show held at the ArtsDepot in North Finchley, London. The event, now in its third year, raised over £20,000 for the North London Hospice charity.

Discography

Album
 Lights, Camera, Action (2006)
The album was originally due for release in November 2006, but was shelved due to poor sales of the lead single "D.I.S.C.O.". Despite the album never being released, four singles were taken from it: "D.I.S.C.O.", "Curvy Cola Bottle Body Baby", "Are You In It For Love" and his number-one single, "It's Chico Time".

 "I Wanna Dance With You"
 "D.I.S.C.O."
 "Take My Breath Away"
 "Come With Me"
 "Cheeky Bow Wow"
 "If I'm Not The One"
 "Crazy"
 "Are You in It For Love"
 "Girls of The World"
 "Curvy Cola Bottle Body Baby"
 "Lights, Camera, Action"
 "Girls, Girls, Girls"
 "Good Day"
 "Prisoner of Love"
 "It's Chico Time"

Singles

Music videos

Filmography

Actor
2004: Winner Takes All .... Narrator
2005: Hell to Pay .... Stripper (Video)
2008: Ten Dead Men .... Himself
2009: 45 .... Banks
2009: 31 North 62 East (also known as Too Close to the Truth (UK alternative title))

Composer
2004: Winner Takes All
2007: Left Holding Baby

Producer
2004: Winner Takes All (producer)
2007: Left Holding Baby (executive producer)

References

External links
Chico Official website

MaChico Bros. Official website

1971 births
Living people
British Sufis
Welsh male stage actors
Welsh pop singers
Male erotic dancers
People from Bridgend
People from Crawley
Sony BMG artists
The X Factor (British TV series) contestants
British people of Moroccan descent
Welsh people of African descent
21st-century Welsh male actors
21st-century Welsh male singers